Lija Athletic Football Club (Commonly referred to as Lija Athletic) is a football team originating from the village of Lija, Malta. The present club was founded in 1949 and has competed in the Maltese Premier League five times. During the 2021–22 Maltese Challenge League campaign, Lija Athletic finished in 7th place and although finishing in mid table, well-known striker Lydon Micallef finished as the league top scorer with 18 goals to his name.

History
Although the first team in Lija is believed to have been formed in the 1930s, the first team to take part in the competitions organised by the Malta Football Association were Lija Amateurs. Lija Amateurs were founded in 1944 and in season 1944–45, they took part in the Second Division. The team was disbanded after three years.

In 1948–49, the present club, Lija Athletic were founded. The club joined the MFA and played in Division Three. The team was gaining momentum, until during a Third Division league match against Qormi Youngsters in March 1957, the referee abandoned the game due to fighting between the players. The MFA suspended the club from all football activities. However this decision was reviewed and the team was back in 1958.

The club tasted its first success when winning the Third Division Championship in 1962–63. The team was relegated in 1968–69 and it took Lija Athletic nine years to regain promotion to the Second Division, once again winning the Third Division title. The introduction of the Premier Division by the MFA in 1980 meant that all clubs were promoted by one division. Lija Athletic found themselves in the First Division. After a rather good performance during the first season in Division One, Lija were relegated in 1981–82.

The club won promotion to the First Division in 1987–88, but after one year they were back to Division Two. In 1990–91, Lija Athletic were relegated to the Third Division. After three years in Division Three, the Athletic won three consecutive promotions way up to the Premier League after winning the championships of Divisions Three and Two and placing second in Division One. In the Premier League for the first time ever, during the season of 1996–97, Lija Athletic had a very hard time with the big guns of local football, and were relegated after placing last.

Lija Athletic regained Premiership status after placing second in season 2001–02, and after a quick return to Division One, they managed to regain promotion thanks to the runner-up position obtained in season 2003–04. Once again the Premier Division challenge was too much, and with 3 wins, 2 draws and 19 lost games, Lija finished in last place. In 2005–06 Lija Athletic continued the habit of leaving their division after one year, but this time the destination was the Second Division, after finishing 9th with 18 points in 18 games. In 2006–07 the team obtained a position in mid-table, finishing 7th place. In spite of a poorer record, the team climbed to 6th place the following season.
In 2008–09 Lija Athletic were able to challenge for promotion, although they had to settle for third place behind Melita FC and local rivals Balzan Youths, thereby just missing out.

The 2009–10 season saw Lija Athletic strengthening the squad with several experienced players and some talented youngsters. From the early stages it was obvious the team would again be challengers for promotion, and with 48 points Lija Athletic won the Second Division championship and secured promotion to the First Division.

In Season 2013–14, Lija Athletic reached a new milestone when qualifying for the FA Trophy Semi-finals for the first time in the club's history, following exceptional wins including one against Premier giants, Floriana F.C. Lija Athletic were eliminated from the competition with a narrow 0–1 loss to Qormi F.C. in the FA Trophy Semi-final.

Following seven (7) seasons in the First Division, Lija Athletic regained promotion to the top flight, the Premier League, for the fourth time in the club's history, this time winning the First Division League with a total of 54 points. This is the first time in the club's history that Lija Athletic won the First Division Championship, with a relatively young squad.

Players

Current squad (2022–23)

Current Staff (2021-22)

Technical Team (2022-23)

Administration (2021–22)

Records

Club Top Scorers

History (2000's Era)

External links

Official website
Official website

 
Football clubs in Malta
Association football clubs established in 1949
1949 establishments in Malta